Riad Shehata (died in 1942) was an Egyptian photographer.

He was the official photographer of the King of Egypt, in charge of photographing royal events such as marriages, enthronement ceremonies and formal parties. He was the first Egyptian photographer to travel abroad; he went to Frankfurt in Germany where he studied the art of photography extensively. He travelled around the world in order to take rare photographs. His studio was located in downtown Cairo's Opera Square. After his death in 1942, the studio remained open under the same name. The Riad Shehata Studio was notably charged by King Farouk with photographing in minute detail the extensive damage resulting from the devastating 1952 Cairo Fire. In 2003, 275 rare photographs from the Riad Shehata Studio were bought by a private collector from the photographer's family.

References

1942 deaths
Egyptian photographers
Year of birth missing